Aluf (Maj. Gen.) Mordechai (Motti) Hod (Hebrew: מרדכי הוד; 28 September 1926 – 29 June 2003) was the Commander of the Israeli Air Force during the 1967 Six-Day War.

Biography 
Hod was born in the British Mandate of Palestine in Kibbutz Degania in 1926. Hod originally had the surname Fine which he changed later on to Hod, keeping with the prevalent custom that period of taking a Hebrew surname when joining the armed forces.

Hod studied at a local Agriculture College before enlisting in the British Army in 1944, where he served as a driver. With the end of the Second World War Hod joined the Haganah's Palmach groundforce. In this capacity he assisted Aliyah Bet, illegal Jewish immigration from Europe to Palestine. He was arrested and jailed for two weeks in Rome for taking part in such actions.

Hod began his flight training career in Italy but was soon sent to Czechoslovakia. The newly created IAF was in need of modern military aircraft, and had purchased several Spitfires and Messerschmitts in that country.  Once purchased it was necessary to fly them to Israel, and after learning to fly the new planes, Hod accompanied a group of fellow aviators on the seven-hour flight on 22 December 1948.

Back in Israel, Hod's IAF career commenced. Despite some previous experience flying, Hod attended the IAF Flight Academy, and graduated with its first class on 14 March 1949. A year later Hod was again sent abroad, this time to learn how to fly the Gloster Meteor in Britain, which would be Israel's first jet fighter. Returning to Israel in 1951, Hod was appointed commander of a squadron of P-51 Mustangs. During the 1956 Suez Crisis Hod led several support missions, including fighter escort for planes laden with paratroopers and air cover for troops on the ground. For the decade after the conflict Hod continued to advance through the ranks of the IAF. He became a base commander in 1957, and three years later the head of IAF Operations. Just one year later in 1961, Hod was promoted to head of the Air Department in the General Staff. He would stay in this post until 27 April 1966, when Hod became Commander of the IAF. During his tenure, the Mossad conducted Operation Diamond to smuggle a Soviet-built MiG-21 into Israel.

Slightly more than a year into his job, Hod faced an enormous predicament.  Egyptian President Gamal Abdel Nasser had closed the Straits of Tiran, and Israel was facing the possibility of a three front war against Egypt, Jordan, and Syria.  Hoping to retain the advantage of surprise, Israel launched Operation Focus, the opening airstrike in what would become known as the 1967 Six-Day War.  Hod's strike, leaving only 12 planes to defend Israel, and aided with intelligence from Mossad and Aman, succeeded in destroying most of the Egyptian Air Forces. Later strikes annihilated Jordanian and Syrian Air Forces as well as part of Iraqi Air Force.  This ensured Israeli air superiority for the rest of the war.  In an interview years later, Hod described the 45 minutes it took the first wave of 183 aircraft to reach targets in Egypt as "the longest 45 minutes of my life." Hod also had to deal with the USS Liberty incident, in which Israeli aircraft attacked an American ship off the coast of the Sinai Peninsula, killing 34 servicemen.

The War of Attrition between Israel and Egypt would last from 1968 to 1970, and during that time Hod directed airstrikes near the Suez Canal as well as deeper into Egyptian territory.  He also succeeded in downing a number of Soviet-piloted MiG aircraft operating on behalf of Egypt.

In April 1973, Hod stepped down, just 6 months prior to the 1973 Yom Kippur War.  Because of the war he was quickly recalled to act as the Air Force advisor to Maj. Gen. Yitzhak Hofi, who was then in charge of Israeli Northern Command.  Before moving into the private sector Hod had one more stint in government, tasked with developing defense projects as an assistant to the Defense Minister.  During his military career, Hod met and married an IAF sergeant, Penina.  They had three children.

With his military career over, Hod entered the civilian aviation market in 1975 by founding CAL Cargo Air Lines.  He served as its president until 1977, when he left to become president of El Al, the Israeli national airline, a position he would hold to 1979.  Hod later was appointed chairman of the main aerospace manufacturer in Israel, Israel Aircraft Industries.  He died on 29 June 2003.

References

External links 

 

Israeli aviators
Israeli Air Force generals
Israeli Jews
Jews in Mandatory Palestine
Palmach members
1926 births
Hod, Mordechau
British Army soldiers
Burials at Kiryat Shaul Cemetery